The Oceanic Hotel is a heritage listed building located on Collie Street on the corner of Pakenham Street in Fremantle, Western Australia. 

The building was constructed in 1898 an occupies the site where the Welsh Harp Hotel also known as the Collie Hotel formerly stood.

The two storey truncated corner building is made of painted brick and has zero setback from the pavement. A bull nosed corrugated veranda awning wraps around the building's corner. The roof line is fronted by decorative parapet with four pediments with 1898  inscribed in the stucco on the corner pediment. The Pakenham Street side of the building features extensive stained glass lead lights in the windows where Oceanic Hotel name appears in the glass.

The building was converted to six strata titled apartments during the 1980s. One of the apartments was extensively refurbished in 2005 winning the architectural firm, spaceagency, the RAIA Residential Award in 2006.
It is currently used as holiday apartments.

See also
List of heritage places in Fremantle

References

Collie Street, Fremantle
Hotels established in 1898
Hotels in Fremantle
1898 establishments in Australia
Fremantle West End Heritage area
State Register of Heritage Places in the City of Fremantle